Carex fulta is a tussock-forming species of perennial sedge in the family Cyperaceae. It is native to parts of Honshu in Japan.

See also
List of Carex species

References

fulta
Taxa named by Adrien René Franchet
Plants described in 1895
Flora of Japan